Luka Radelić (born 8 March 1981 in Split) is a Croatian sailor. Radelic represented Croatia at the 2008 Summer Olympics in Beijing, where he competed for the Laser class. He placed twelfth out of forty-three Laser sailors at the end of ten preliminary races in this event, with a score of 101 net points.

Radelic achieved his best results in Laser sailing by winning the championship title at the 2005 International New Year's Regatta – Laser Europa Cup in Hvar. He is also a member of Mornar Sailing Club in his home city Split, and is coached and trained by Nenad Viali.

References

External links
 
 
 
 
 

1981 births
Living people
Croatian male sailors (sport)
Olympic sailors of Croatia
Sailors at the 2008 Summer Olympics – Laser
Sportspeople from Split, Croatia